Hessville is a hamlet in the Town of Minden in Montgomery County, New York, United States. It is located on New York State Route 163 (NY 163).

References

Hamlets in New York (state)
Hamlets in Montgomery County, New York